LX (stylized as Lx) is an American news brand for original content for the NBCUniversal-owned television stations. LX is short for Local X, with the "X" standing for "exponential". LX is a part of the station group's multicast division LXTV, led by senior vice president Meredith McGinn, content strategy vice president Matt Goldberg and managing editor Meagan Harris. 

LX is available on terrestrial television, Xfinity cable, over-the-top for Peacock, FuboTV, Xumo, Samsung TV Plus, and The Roku Channel viewers, social media and via its website.

Its roots trace back to 2009 when NBCUniversal's previous news & lifestyle multicast network NBC Nonstop (now known as classic TV-formatted Cozi TV) was launched on its owned and operated station group, mostly on NBC-O&O affiliates that previously carried NBC Weather Plus. Its programming included core shows from LXTV.

LX content features long form content, a switch from prior NBCUniversal efforts at NBC News Now with Briefly and Snapchat news show Stay Tuned, created to reach Gen Z and millennials. With the broadcast network and streaming television channel, there will be two live programming blocks (7-10 AM and PM) of three hour daily newscasts produced at KXAS. LX programming originally came from station groups and the owned and separately operated LXTV Productions, with the expectation to license additional content to fill out the day. The additional content comes from Jukin Media, Tastemade and The Dodo. The main newscast when launched will be two hours long.

NBCU stations' desire to reach younger audiences led to the creation of the LX content brand. On September 23, 2019, the station group launched its LX news digitally initially on YouTube, its website and social media. LX was launched as a live-streaming channel and multicast over-the-air network in May 2020.

Programming
Programming of LX includes:
 Current - Events, pop culture trends and entertainment news.
 LX News - a storytelling approach to news that is personal, inspiring, thought-provoking, and community focused.
 LX News Zone - a daily digest of the latest news from NBC local stations.
 LX Explains - a deep dive into the issues and events impacting communities and the world; focusing on the environment, politics, technology, community, social justice, and current events, with an innovative storytelling approach to news.
 LX Presents - Daily and weekly specials that feature LX documentary stories, explainers and robust storytelling from NBC owned TV stations and NBC News digital.

Affiliates
, LX has current or pending affiliation agreements with 58 television stations in 54 media markets encompassing 31 states and the District of Columbia, reaching 59.1% (or a total population of 184,684,608 residents) of all households in the United States that own at least one television set.

Stations listed in bold are LX owned-and-operated.

List of affiliates

See also
 Current TV (defunct)
 Free Speech TV (active; satellite, cable, OTT)
 Vice (active; cable and OTT)

References

NBCUniversal networks
Television news in the United States
Internet properties established in 2019
Television channels and stations established in 2019
Internet television channels